Čiflik is a village in the municipality of Želino, North Macedonia.

Demographics
As of the 2021 census, Čiflik had 1,033 residents with the following ethnic composition:
Albanians 1,023
Persons for whom data are taken from administrative sources 10

According to the 2002 census, the village had a total of 1,180 inhabitants. Ethnic groups in the village include:
Albanians 1,176
Others 4

References

External links

Villages in Želino Municipality
Albanian communities in North Macedonia